Mr. Trot is a South Korean reality television and talent show. The show is the male version of the popular Miss Trot, an audition show for singers who perform trot music. It was produced with the planning intent of "a new concept trot audition program that will add firepower to the hot-tempered Korean trot craze and create a next-generation trot star that will lead the second trot heyday". It aired on TV Chosun every Thursday from January 2 to March 12, 2020.

Mr. Trot became one of the most popular shows on Korean television.  it is the highest rated show in cable television history of South Korea.

In 2022, it was announced that Mr. Trot would be returning for its second season. The season aired its first episode on December 22, 2022 at 22:00 KST on TV Chosun.

Broadcast

Main host

Season 1 and 2 
 Kim Sung-joo

List of masters

Season 1 

 Jang Yoon-jeong
 Jo Young-soo
 Noh Sa-yeon
 
 
 Park Hyun-bin
 Park Myeong-su
 Jang Young-ran
 Shin Ji
 Boom
 Kim Jun-su
 Kim Se-yeon
 Hyojung (Oh My Girl)

Season 2 

Legend:
  – Present
  – Absent

List of contestants

Season 1

Season 2

List of episodes

Season 1

Episodes 1 - 2: Introduction and 101-Contestant Master Audition 
Each contestant performs in front of a panel of 13 judges. Each judge may award the contestant a "heart", signified by lighting up a heart-shaped display next to their chair.

Bold = Contestants who are able to advance to the next round.

Episodes 3 - 4: Mission 1: Team Mission 
The 48 remaining survivors of the first round of the tournament.

Episodes 4 - 6: Mission 2 - Death Match (1 VS 1) 
In the second round of the tournament., 30 survivors remain.

  – Contestant won.
  – Contestant lost.

Episode 7 - 8: Mission 3

Round 1 
In this round, at the end of every groups' performance, the 10 masters will give their grading, with 100 marks as the full mark. On the other hand, the 500 audiences will be able to donate at most 1 million won to each of the group. Donation of 1 million won will be equivalent to 1 mark counted to the teams' marks. The money, in the end, will be donated to the children in need.

Round 2

Episode 8 - 10: Semi-Final Mission

1st Round: Individual Match (Legend Mission)

2nd Round: 1 VS 1 (Duet Match) 

  – Contestant advance to next mission.
  – Contestant lost.

Episode 12: Final Missions

Season 2 
Each contestant performs in front of a panel of 15 judges. Each judge may award the contestant a "heart", signified by lighting up a heart-shaped display next to their chair.

The judging criteria for Season 2 preliminary match (mentioned at the start of Season 2 Episode 1) is as followed:

 For contestant who had received 8 hearts and below will automatically be eliminated from the audition.
 For contestants who had received within 9 to 15 hearts will temporarily advance to the next round of the audition.
 For contestants who had received "All Heart (which is equivalent to 15 hearts)" will automatically be able to advance to the next round of the audition.

Legend:
 Bold = Contestants who are able to advance to the next round.
 <Preliminary Audition> Top 3 position box colour code:
  – 1st Place: 진(眞)
  – 2nd Place: 선(善)
  – 3rd Place: 미(美)

After the <Preliminary Audition> had ended, a total of 73 contestants were able to move on to the next round.

Episodes 1 - 3: Introduction and 119-Contestants Master Audition

Special episode: Un-aired "All Hearts" Special 
The special episode was aired on January 10, 2023 on a Tuesday.

In this episode, those contestants who although manage to achieve "All Hearts" from the 15 judges but their parts were not aired on the regular broadcast will be all featured in this episode.

Episodes 3 - 5: Team Mission 
The judging criteria for Season 2 team mission (mentioned at the start of Season 2 Episode 3 team mission) is as followed:
 For groups who had received 14 hearts and below, all the team members will be subjected to elimination from the audition program. Afterwards, all the judges will have a meeting and come down to a decision in which contestant(s) will be able to move on to the next round.
 For groups who had received "All Heart (which is equivalent to 15 hearts)", all team members will automatically be able to advance to the next round of the audition.

Legend:
 Bold = Contestants who are able to advance to the next round.
 <Team Mission> 1st position box colour code:
  – 1st Place: 진(眞)

After the <Team Mission> ended, a total of 40 contestants were able to advance on to the next round.

Episodes 5 - 7: Death Match (1 VS 1) 
The judging criteria for Season 2 death match (1 vs 1) is as followed:
 After the pair of contestant had finished their performance, judges will make their decision by choosing which one of the contestant to give their heart to.
 If contestant won the death match, they will automatically move on to the next round.
 If contestant lost during the death match, they will be subjected to elimination.

Legend:
 Bold = Contestant able to move on to the next round.
 Box colour:
  – Contestant won.
  – Contestant lost.
  – Contestant on top of wining the Death Match, also achieved 1st Place: 진(眞)

After the <Death Match (1 VS 1)> had ended, a total of 25 contestants were able to advance on to the next round.

Episodes 8 - 9: Medley Team Mission 

In this mission, top 5 contestant from the last round will be able to recruit their own members to form their team.

Also, on top of the 13 masters, this time round, 300 audiences would also be given a chance to vote.

Only the members of the group that won the 1st place, will be able to automatically be able to move on to the next round.
Rest of the contestants they will be subjected to elimination

Round 1: Medley Team Mission 
The scoring for Round 1: Medley Team Mission is as followed:
 Maximum master score is 1300 points, with each master team able to give up to 100 points to each group.
 Maximum audience score is 300 points.
 Hence, the total score a team able to achieve would be 1600 points.
 The group which was able to clinched the 1st place on the 1st round will be able to get an extra 30 points.

Round 2: Team Leader Battle 
Similarly in the 2nd round, the scoring is as followed:
 Maximum master score is 1300 points, with each master team able to give up to 100 points to each group.
 Maximum audience score is 300 points.
 Hence, the total score a team able to achieve would be 1600 points.

Episodes 10 - present: Rival Match

Soundtrack

Ratings

Season 1

Season 2

Notes

References

External links 
 Season 1 Official Website 
 Season 2 Official Website 

South Korean music television shows
Music competitions in South Korea
Korean-language television shows
2020 South Korean television series debuts
South Korean reality television series
Trot television series